Carlos Cano de la Fuente (3 October 1955 – 23 December 2015) was a Peruvian actor.

He was married to actress Patricia Frayssinet, with whom he had three children: Alonso Cano, Carolina Cano (both actors), and Rodrigo Cano.

Filmography
 La Casa de Enfrente (1984)
 Páginad de la Vida (1984)
 Carmín (1985)
 Los de Arriba y los de Abajo (1995)
 Los Unos y Los Otros (1995)
 Tribus de la Calle (1996)
 Lluvia de Arena (1996)
 Todo se Compra, todo se vende (1997)
 La Rica Vicky (1998)
 Procura Amarme Más (1999)
 Estrellita (2000)
 Éxtasis (2001)
 Cazando a un Millonario (2001)
 Mil Oficios (2001–2002)
 Que buena raza (2002–2003)
 Demasiada belleza (2003)
 Luciana y Nicolás (2003)
 Eva del Edén (2004)
 La Pre (2008)
 La Perricholi (2011)
 Avenida Perú (2013)

Television series
 El Conspirador (1981)
 Matrimonios y algo más (1983)
 Gamboa (1983–85)
 Túpac Amaru (1984)
 César Vallejo (1986)
 El Proceso (1986)
 Raymondi por las Rutas del Perú (1989)
 La Perricholi (1992)
 Bolero (1993)
 Bajo el Mismo Cielo (1997)
 Sarita Colonia (2001)
 El faro (2003)
 Así es la vida (2004–2005)
 Los del solar (2005)
 Condominio S.A. (2006)
 Desde tu butaca (2006–2007)
 Diablos Azules (2007–2008)
 Operación rescate (2010).
 Adiós al 7º de línea (Chile) (2010)
 Conversando con la luna (2012)
 Al fondo hay sitio (2012)
 Guerreros de arena (2013)
 Comando Alfa (2013)

Movies
 Túpac Amaru (1984)
 Dónde está el Muerto (1985)
 Bajo tu piel (1986)
 La fuga del chacal (1987)
 Ultra Warrior (1990)
 Reportaje a la muerte (1993)
 Días de Santiago (2004)
 Domingo (2004)
 La gran sangre: la película (2007)
 Motor y Motivo (2009)
 City Garden (2010)
 Casa Rosada (2011)
 Detrás del espejo (2012)
 Asu Mare (2013)
 El Gran Pajatén (2015)
 Paititi, la ciudad prohibida (2015)

References

1955 births
2015 deaths
20th-century Peruvian male actors
21st-century Peruvian male actors
Peruvian male film actors
Peruvian male television actors
Peruvian male telenovela actors
Place of birth missing